The EMD DH1 was an experimental diesel-hydraulic switching locomotive built by General Motors Electro-Motive Division in May 1906. It was powered by a pair of small diesel engines suspended under the frame, driving through a pair of Allison torque converter transmissions to the inside wheels on each truck.  These inside wheels were substantially smaller than the outside wheels on each truck. One example exists in Clinton, Michigan as of 2020.

Over 60 examples of a three axle DHI and its derivatives were built by Clyde Engineering in Australia and used on private railways, in particular in the sugar industry in Queensland. The Clyde Engineering model was the DHI-71 and the two DHI-110s on Lakewood Firewood Company. These DHI models were built between 6/54 and 6/71.

See also
Lakewood Firewood Co/Commonwealth Railways DH1

References

https://archive.today/20130222135134/http://community-2.webtv.net/ajkristopans/CLYDEENGINEERINGCO/

DH1
Experimental locomotives
Diesel locomotives of the United States